Marburg is a town in Hesse, Germany.

Marburg may also refer to:

Places
 Marburger Schloss, a castle in Marburg, Germany
 University of Marburg, the principal university in the city of Marburg, Germany
 Maribor, Slovenia (also known as Marburg an der Drau before the dissolution of Austria-Hungary)
 University of Maribor, a university in the city of Maribor, Slovenia
 Marburg, South Africa
 Marburg, Queensland, Australia
 Marburg (Virginia), a historic home in Richmond, Virginia

People
 Konrad von Marburg (1180-1233), Inquisitor
 Otto Marburg (1874-1948), Austrian neurologist
 Theodore Marburg (1862-1946), American jurist, diplomat, and internationalist 
 Theodore Marburg Jr. (1893-1922), American who flew with the Royal Flying Corps in WWI 
 William August Marburg (born 1931), American bluegrass musician known as Bill Clifton
 James Marburg (b. 1982), Australian rower

Medicine
 Marburgvirus, a virologic taxon (genus)
 Marburg virus, a virus causing viral hemorrhagic fever in humans
 Marburg virus disease, the disease caused by Marburg virus
 Marburg multiple sclerosis, malignant form of multiple sclerosis

Other
 Marburg Colloquy, a 1529 meeting at Marburg Castle between leaders of the Reformation
 Marburg Files, a series of top-secret foreign minister archives discovered in Germany

See also
 Friedrich Wilhelm Marpurg (1718-1795), German critic, theorist and composer